The 1993 Men's Hockey Junior World Cup was the fifth edition of the men's Hockey Junior World Cup, the quadrennial world championship for men's national under-21 national field hockey teams organized by the International Hockey Federation. It was held from September 8–19 September 1993 in Terrassa, Spain. Germany won their fourth successive title defeating Pakistan in the final. Australia won the bronze medal after defeating dutch.

Results
All times are Central European Summer Time (UTC+02:00)

Preliminary round

Pool A

Pool B

Ninth to twelfth place classification

Cross-overs

Eleventh and twelfth place

Ninth and tenth place

Fifth to eighth place classification

Cross-overs

Seventh and eighth place

Fifth and sixth place

First to fourth place classification

Semi-finals

Third and fourth place

Final

Final standings

Hockey Junior World Cup
Junior World Cup
International field hockey competitions hosted by Catalonia
Sport in Terrassa
Hockey Junior World Cup
Hockey Junior World Cup
Hockey World Cup